Stuart Markland (12 February 1948 – 1 April 2017) was a Scottish footballer who played as a defender. He played junior football for Penicuik Athletic before beginning his senior career with Berwick Rangers in 1966. He joined Dundee United in 1968 and then Montrose in 1973. In 1978, he signed for Sydney Olympic in Australia's National Soccer League. He rejoined Montrose in 1980 and also played for Penicuik again before retiring. Markland died on 1 April 2017, aged 69.

References

External links

1948 births
2017 deaths
Scottish footballers
Footballers from Edinburgh
Association football defenders
Berwick Rangers F.C. players
Dundee United F.C. players
Montrose F.C. players
Scottish Football League players
Scottish expatriate footballers
Expatriate soccer players in Australia
Scottish expatriate sportspeople in Australia
Sydney Olympic FC players
Penicuik Athletic F.C. players
National Soccer League (Australia) players